More Fool Me: A Memoir is the 2014 autobiography of Stephen Fry. The book is a continuation from the end of his 1997 publication, Moab Is My Washpot: An Autobiography, and the 2010 The Fry Chronicles: An Autobiography. It contains an overview of these previous two volumes, and an account of Fry's later cocaine addiction, chiefly covering the years 1986–93. Other major topics include Fry's writing of The Hippopotamus, his work on the TV series A Bit of Fry & Laurie, Jeeves and Wooster and Blackadder Goes Forth; the radio series Saturday Night Fry; and the films Peter's Friends and Stalag Luft. The book is Fry's tenth, and his third volume of autobiography.

Reception 
Critical reception has been mixed but generally negative, citing Fry's reuse of material from earlier works, lack of emotional depth, and his depiction of heavy drug-taking.

References

External links 
 StephenFry.com

Books by Stephen Fry
British autobiographies
2014 non-fiction books
Show business memoirs
Michael Joseph books